John Hoyt may refer to:
John Hoyt, actor
John Benedict Hoyt, American minister
John Philo Hoyt, Governor of Arizona
John Wesley Hoyt (1831–1910), U.S. politician

See also 
 John Hoyte (1835-1913), New Zealand painter